Two ships built in 1888 carried the name Paris. They further disambiguated by builder.

Ship names